Agathoclea Theotropus (the epithet possibly means the Goddess-like) was an Indo-Greek queen married to Menander I, who ruled in parts of northern India in the 2nd-century BC as regent for her son Strato I. Born in Bactria, likely to a noble family (probably royal) with some authors such as Tarn alleging she was a daughter of Eucratides, however this is uncertain and Tarn is often criticised by modern authors for casually creating dynastic relationships. Nonetheless, Agathoclea would become one of the first woman ruler in the Hellenistic world, and she seems to have been relatively significant due to her large presence on the coins of Strato I.

Date and genealogy
The traditional view, introduced by Tarn and defended as late as 1998 by Bopearachchi, is that Agathokleia was the widow of Menander I. She may also have been the daughter of Eucratides. In the civil wars after Menander's death, the Indo-Greek empire was divided, with Agathokleia and her young son Strato maintaining themselves in the eastern territories of Gandhara and Punjab.

The modern view, embraced by R. C. Senior and probably more solid since it is founded on numismatical analyses, suggests that Agathokleia was a later queen, perhaps ruling from 110 BC–100 BC or slightly later. In this case, Agathoclea was likely the widow of another king, possibly Nicias or Theophilus. In either case, Agathokleia was among the first women to rule a Hellenistic Kingdom.

Some of her subjects may have been reluctant to accept an infant king with a queen regent: unlike the Seleucid and Ptolemaic Kingdoms, almost all Indo-Greek rulers were depicted as grown men. This was probably because the kings were required to command armies, as can be seen on their coins where they are often depicted with helmets and spears. Agathokleia seems to have associated herself with Athena, the goddess of war. Athena was also the dynastic deity of the family of Menander, and Agathokleia's prominent position suggests that she was herself the daughter of a king, though she was probably too late to have been a daughter of the Bactrian king Agathocles.

Coinage

The coins of Agathokleia and Strato were all bilingual, and Agathoclea's name appears more often in the Greek legend than in the Indian.

(See Strato I for details of legends.)

Most of Agathoclea's coins were struck jointly with her son Strato, though on their first issues, he is not featured on the portrait.

Silver: Bust of Agathoclea/walking king

Bust of Strato and Agathoclea conjoined/Athena Alcidemus

Bronzes: Bust of either helmeted Athena or Agathoclea as a personification of this goddess/sitting Heracles

The later king Heliocles II overstruck some of Agathoclea's coins.

See also
Greco-Buddhism
Indo-Scythians

References

Sources
W. W. Tarn. The Greeks in Bactria and India. Third Edition. Cambridge: University Press, 1966.

External links
Main coins of Agathokleia
Web page of Agathokleia's coins

Indo-Greek kings
2nd-century BC Indian monarchs
2nd-century BC women rulers
2nd-century BC Greek people
Indian female royalty
Ancient Indian women
Ancient Greek women rulers
Euthydemid dynasty
Ancient Greek regents